The Long Beach Bombers were an Amateur Athletic Union-sanctioned Tier II junior ice hockey team in Western Division of the Western States Hockey League (WSHL). The team played their home games at The Rinks – Lakewood Ice in Lakewood, California.

History
Before moving to Tier III Junior A hockey, the Bombers competed in Junior B hockey from 1994 until 2007 when the team and WSHL were upgraded to Tier III Jr. A status. In 2011, the league left USA Hockey sanctioning and joined the Amateur Athletic Union and in 2012, the AAU-sanctioned United Hockey Union. In 2015, the Bombers and the WSHL were promoted to Tier II under the AAU sanctioning.

Led by Dr. Don Thorne, the team was a founding member of the WSHL in 1993 as the Anaheim Jr. Ducks and won the first two Thorne Cup Championships of the league's existence. The franchise was then transferred to Ron White, a rink owner and president of the Southern California Bombers youth hockey programs, and the team became the Southern California Jr. Bombers  in the 1996 offseason. Like Dr. Thorne before him, White also became commissioner of the WSHL by 1998. The Bombers were also branded as the Bay City Bombers in 2006, and then revised their name once more becoming the Long Beach Bombers in 2010.

In 2019, White sold the Bombers to a new ownership group and was rebranded as the Long Beach Jets. White then used the Bombers' branding to launch a new WSHL team in Barrhead, Alberta. On August 12, the WSHL announced that the Jets ceased operations prior to the 2019–20 season. The Bombers were the last founding franchise of the WSHL still playing in the league.

Season-by-season records

Alumni
The Bombers have had a number of alumni move on to higher levels of junior, college, and professional ice hockey.

References

External links 
Official Team Website
Official League Website

Ice hockey teams in California
1993 establishments in California
Ice hockey clubs established in 1993
Sports in Long Beach, California